Noel Harris, also known as  "Harry" or "NGH", is a former jockey in Thoroughbred racing in New Zealand.  He is notable for having ridden 2,167 raceday winners in New Zealand which is the fourth highest total behind Chris Johnson, David Walsh and Lance O'Sullivan and he has won the jockeys' premiership in both New Zealand and Singapore.

In 2018 Harris was inducted into the New Zealand Racing Hall of Fame.

Riding career

Noel Harris was apprenticed at Woodville to his father, John William (Jock) Harris who was a leading jockey both on the flat and over jumps before becoming a horse trainer. Noel rode his first winner at Foxton on 16 May 1970 and took out the 1971–72 apprentice jockeys' premiership at 18-years-old before sharing the national jockeys' premiership with David Peake the following year.

Harris achieved 34 Group One wins, including almost all of the major races, in New Zealand.

Amongst his total is:
 three Wellington Cups on Castletown  
 four New Zealand Cups 
 three New Zealand Cups

As an 18 year old Noel rode the Jock Harris-trained Glengowan to a close second behind Gala Supreme in the 1973 Melbourne Cup. 34 years later he rode Princess Coup in the 2007 Cup.

His biography Harry, The Ride Of My Life by Wally O'Hearn was released in August 2012.

Noel retired in 2015 and became a National Riding mentor for apprentice jockeys.

Family

Noel's two oldest siblings, John and Des, were leading apprentice jockeys.  Noel's three other siblings Peter, Karen and Jenny, were also jockeys.

John, Des and Peter would go on to be horse trainers.

Noel's son Troy Harris is a successful jockey.

Notable victories

The following are some of the major races Noel has won.

See also 
 Opie Bosson
 Chris Johnson
 Thoroughbred racing in New Zealand

References

Living people
Year of birth missing (living people)
New Zealand jockeys
New Zealand Racing Hall of Fame inductees